Anvar Anasovich Gazimagomedov (born 11 May 1988) is a Russian former professional football player. He played as a right midfielder.

Club career
He made his Russian Premier League debut for FC Anzhi Makhachkala on 18 March 2016 in a game against FC Spartak Moscow.

Career statistics

Club

External links
 
 

1988 births
Footballers from Makhachkala
Living people
Russian footballers
Association football midfielders
FC Anzhi Makhachkala players
Russian Premier League players
FC Armavir players